Secrets of Scotland Yard is a 1944 American thriller film directed by George Blair and starring Edgar Barrier, Stephanie Bachelor and C. Aubrey Smith. The screenplay was by Denison Clift, adapting one of his own stories "Room 40, O.B." from Blue Book Magazine. It concerns a British police detective who goes undercover to root out a Nazi spy in Britain's decoding organization.

Cast
 Edgar Barrier as John Usher / Robert Usher 
 Stephanie Bachelor as Sudan Ainger 
 C. Aubrey Smith as Sir Christopher Pelt 
 Lionel Atwill as Waterlow 
 Henry Stephenson as Sir Reginald Meade 
 John Abbott as Mortimer Cope 
 Walter Kingsford as Roylott Bevan 
 Martin Kosleck as Josef 
 Forrester Harvey as Alfred Morgan 
 Frederick Worlock as Mason 
 Matthew Boulton as Colonel Hedley 
 Bobby Cooper as David Usher

Critical reception
Silentcomedymafia.com noted that director "Blair keeps up the pace and suspense perfectly well, giving the film a relatively expensive look when you know full well (Republic president) Herbert Yates is pinching every penny."
In The Star-spangled Screen: The American World War II Film,  Bernard F. Dick called the film  "first-rate espionage and one of the studios classier efforts...Another instance of a minor film that shows considerably more intelligence than many major ones. It is the only film of the period to explain the techniques of Cryptoanalysis, particularly how page numbers of a book can provide the key to a code."

Bibliography
 Dick, Bernard F. The Star-Spangled Screen: The American World War II Film. University Press of Kentucky, 1996. 
 Glancy, H. Mark. When Hollywood Loved Britain: The Hollywood 'British' Film 1939-1945. Manchester University Press, 1999.

External links

References

1944 films
1940s spy thriller films
American spy thriller films
World War II spy films
Films directed by George Blair
Films set in London
Films set in England
Republic Pictures films
Films based on short fiction
World War II films made in wartime
Films set in the 1940s
American black-and-white films
1940s English-language films